The Presidential Cycling Tour of Turkey is a professional road bicycle racing stage race held annually in Turkey since 1963.

In 2005 the race became part of the UCI Europe Tour, rated as a 2.2 event, before being upgraded to 2.1 in 2008, and then to 2.HC for the 2010 edition. The race became part of the UCI World Tour in 2017, and was relegated to the newly formed UCI ProSeries in 2020.

Winners

General classification

Wins per country since 1963

Points classification

Wins per country since 2010

Mountains classification

Wins per country since 2010

Turkish Beauties (Sprints) classification

Wins per country since 2010

Classifications
As of the 2022 edition, the jerseys worn by the leaders of the individual classifications are:
 - Turquoise Jersey – Worn by the leader of the general classification. 
 - Green Jersey – Worn by the leader of the points classification. 
 - Red Jersey – Worn by the leader of the mountains classification. 
 - White Jersey – Worn by the leader of the Turkish Beauties sprints classification.

References

External links
 

 
1968 establishments in Turkey
Cycle races in Turkey
Recurring sporting events established in 1963
UCI World Tour races
UCI Europe Tour races